The Manoram-class ferry are series of watercraft built by Inland Marine Works Pvt Ltd Port Blair, at its Chanch Shipyard, Gujarat for Indian Navy. They are fully air-conditioned craft and are fitted with modern navigational aids and can ferry 250 passengers.

Commission and deployment
INS Manoram (IR Number: 39465): The first ship of the class was commissioned into the Indian Navy at Naval Dockyard (Mumbai) in presence of its Admiral Superintendent namely Rear Admiral AV Subhedar on 7 December 2011.
INS Vihar (IR Number: 41298): The second ship of the class was also commissioned into the Indian Navy at Naval Dockyard, Mumbai in presence of its Admiral superintendent namely Rear Admiral AK Bahl on 9 September 2012.

See also

References

External links
Specifications
INS Manoram Commissioned
INS Vihar Commissioned

Auxiliary ships of the Indian Navy
Ships of the Indian Navy
Auxiliary ferry classes